The Adena Mansion is a historic house museum in Chillicothe, Ohio. It was built for Thomas Worthington by Benjamin Latrobe, and was completed in 1807. The house is located on a hilltop west of downtown Chillicothe. The property surrounding the mansion included the location of the first mound found to belong to the Adena culture and thus the Adena mansion is the namesake for the Adena people. The state coat of arms is thought to depict the view of Mount Logan from the Adena property. The Adena Mansion is open to visitors for a small fee.

History

The stone mansion has historically accurate interiors, including furnishings. The grounds cover  of the original  estate. There is a garden area featuring kitchen herbs and heirloom vegetables, with some varieties available for purchase. A former overseer's house has also been restored and demonstrates life for German immigrants to the area.

A modern museum and education center features exhibits on the early European settlement of Ohio. Documents for indentured servants, other primary source materials and archeological finds are showcased.

Thomas Worthington recorded that he chose Adena as the name for his estate because it referred to "places remarkable for the delightfulness of their situation." The museum at Adena has an exhibit which claims Adena is based on a Hebrew word.

In 2003, the Adena Mansion was restored to its 19th century appearance to celebrate the Ohio Bicentennial. The estate was designated as a National Historic Landmark on February 28, 2003, primarily because it is one of the few surviving examples of Latrobe's designs.

The village of Adena in Jefferson County is named after the Adena Mansion.

See also
List of National Historic Landmarks in Ohio

References

External links

 Ohio Historical Society: Adena

Benjamin Henry Latrobe buildings and structures
Biographical museums in Ohio
Buildings and structures in Chillicothe, Ohio
Historic house museums in Ohio
Houses completed in 1807
Houses in Ross County, Ohio
Museums in Ross County, Ohio
National Historic Landmarks in Ohio
National Register of Historic Places in Ross County, Ohio
Ohio History Connection